Katrin Fridriks (born 1974 in Reykjavík, Iceland), is an abstract painter.

Work
Fusing the natural energies of her native Iceland with an explosive, however organic, abstract expressionism often filtered through painterly installations, Katrin Fridriks explores speed, gravity, and growth along with the interaction of man and nature in different media. One of her creations is installed at the Nautical stadium in Nîmes, but a section of her work connecting with land art has also been an important element in her process. Her painterly creations are often integrated into paintscapes, site-specific installation that exceed the limits of painting traditionally conceived.

Showcased among others in Venice in 2015 during the 56th Art Biennale and at the Reykjavik Art Museum, at the Arts Center in Seoul in 2013, as well as the Liverpool Biennale in 2008, her works are in public and private collections. Fridriks has also received commissions from Pictures on Wall in 2012, Michael Goss Foundation in 2011, Ralph Lauren in 2010, Bacardi Martini, Land Rover as well as the French Ministry for Youth & Sports in 2007.

Commissions and exhibitions

Selected exhibitions
2017
 Solar Panel Art Series Tech Open Air – The Beam with Little Sun Foundation – Berlin
 Das Dasein Circle Culture gallery – Berlin
 Today's Abstract David Pluskwa gallery – Marseille
 Come Alive! Circle Culture gallery - Hamburg
2016
 Abstract Masters group show, Helene Bailly gallery – Paris
 ART16 duo show, Circle Culture gallery – London 
 Macrocosm solo show, Lazarides gallery – London
 Still Here, A Decade of Lazarides gallery – London
2015
 "New Wave" solo show, Circle Culture gallery – Hamburg
 Art International, Circle Culture gallery – Istanbul
 Global Art Affairs Foundation & European Cultural Center – "Personal Structures – Crossing Borders" – Palazzo Bembo – Venice
 Reykjavík Art Museum – "Just Painted II" Kjarvalsstaðir – Reykjavik
 ART15 Circle Culture gallery – London
2014
Art14 duo show, Circle Culture gallery – London
Flying Awareness solo show, Lazarides gallery – London
Solo show, Circle Culture gallery – Berlin
2013
Brafa, Helene Bailly gallery – Brussels
India Art Fair, Ltd gallery – New Delhi
Art13, solo show, Circle Culture gallery – London
Art Paris, Helene Bailly gallery – Paris
"Brutal" Lazarides gallery – London
"Potse68" Circle Culture gallery – Berlin
2012
Design Days Dubaï, Stilwerk design gallery – Dubaï
"Escape the golden cage" – Vienna
"Space//Form" curated by Sven Davis – Portland
Circle Culture gallery @ The Burlington Social Club, Royal Academy - London
2011
Soho House "Urban Artist" Circle Culture gallery – Berlin
Circle Culture gallery "Leak of Information" solo show – Berlin
Pascal Janssens gallery "Mothernature" solo show – Ghent
Forum Grimaldi "40 ans du pressionnisme" – Monaco
Goss-Michael Foundation / MTV "Re:define" – Dallas
LeBasse gallery "The Future is not what it used to be" – Los Angeles
The Border Contemporary art zone Lineart, solo show, Pascal Janssens gallery – Ghent
2010
Circle Culture gallery – No such thing as good painting about nothing – Berlin
Inauguration New Contemporary Art Center – Épinal
Volta 6– Art Basel, Circleculture gallery – Basel
Circle Culture gallery – Salon du Cercle de la Culture – Berlin
Moniker Art Fair – "Project Space" solo show, Circleculture gallery – London
The Border –Contemporary Art Zone Lineart solo show, Pascal Janssens gallery – Ghent
2009
"Tag" Grand Palais – Paris
CAL Salon 2009 – Luxembourg
Bailly Contemporain – Salon du Collectionneur, Grand Palais – Paris
2008
Center of Icelandic Art, SIM "Barbie-Q" – Reykjavik
Biennial of Liverpool – Novas Contemporary Urban Centre "Nice08" – Liverpool
Vigdís Finnbogadóttir Foundation – Reykjavik
2007
eArts Festival "Digital Experience" curator for Visual Systems – Shanghai
Palais Bénédictine "Mangeurs d'étoiles" solo show – Fécamp
Ice07 Cultural & Art Festival – Liverpool
Sequences Art Festival – Reykjavik

Commissions and grants

 CAB apart – special commission – glass and light installation – Luxembourg
 "Royale Gene&Ethics" black edition new print release – Lazarides edition – London
 Icelandic Art Center – Grant for the installation "Perception of the Stendhal Syndrome" – Venice
 MTV Re:Define 2014 – Goss Michael Foundation at Dallas Contemporary – Dallas
 Soho House Permanent collection (Nick Jones) curated by Francesca Gavin – London
"100 Nike" Grazia Pop-up – Circle Culture agency – Berlin
First silkscreen prints limited edition "golden awareness" Pictures on Walls – London
Artcurial auction "100 briques" Hôtel Marcel Dassault – Paris
Pierre Bergé auction "Empreintes urbaines" Palais d’Iéna – Paris
Phillips de Pury auction, "MTV Re-Define" Goss Michael Foundation – Dallas
Ralph Lauren, "Art Stars", Charity Teenage Cancer Trust, Phillips de Pury – London
International Campaign Award "Land Rover 60 yrs" – Defender SVX 1/25 edition
Biennial of Liverpool "Made up risk boxes" Grants by the Trade Council of Iceland
Center for Icelandic Art – Liverpool
Minister of Culture, Higher Education & Research: Catalog "Face" – Luxembourg
Minister of Health, Youth & Sports for the New Olympic Stadium of Nîmes', Fresco *"Red Sea" 80m², constructed by Bouygues & Architect BVL
Bacardi Martini: customizing "special metal box" Bénédictine

Notes and references

External links 
 Katrin Fridriks 

Katrin Fridriks
Katrin Fridriks
1974 births
Living people